Aïn Soltane is a town and commune in Saïda Province, Algeria.

References

Communes of Saïda Province